The Burhi Gandak River is a tributary of the Ganges. It is known as Narayani in its upper reaches. The Burhi (“Old”) Gandak flows parallel to and east of the Gandak River in an old channel.

Course
The Burhi Gandak originates from Chautarwa Chaur near Bisambharpur in the district of West Champaran in Bihar. It initially flows through the East Champaran district. In this portion, the river spills over its banks and a number of spill channels take off and rejoin it later.

The Burhi Gandak runs a zig-zag course through the districts of Samastipur and Begusarai before covering a short distance in Khagaria district, running by the side of the town of Khagaria, and flows into the Ganges near Gogri and near Bairarpur in Munger . It forms the western boundary of the Khagaria town and a protection embankment built along the eastern side of this river, protects Khagaria town from the floods of Burhi Gandak.

Tributaries
The main tributaries of the Burhi Gandak are - Masan, Balor, Pandai, Sikta, Tilawe, Tiur, Dhanauti, Kohra, Anjankote, Danda and lauriya , .

References

 

Rivers of Bihar
Rivers of India